Houcine Anafal (15 September 1952 – 22 August 2012) was a Moroccan professional footballer who played for clubs in Europe, including Stade Rennais F.C. as well as the Morocco national football team.

Club career
Born in Kenitra, Anafal played senior football with KAC Kénitra over two spells, winning the 1972–73 Botola with the club. He also had two spells in France's Ligue 1 with Rennes, and one spell in Ligue 2 with Stade Quimpérois.

International career
Anafal made several appearances for the full Morocco national football team, including qualifying matches for the 1974 FIFA World Cup and 1978 FIFA World Cup. He also participated at the 1978 African Cup of Nations.

References

1952 births
2012 deaths
Moroccan footballers
Moroccan expatriate footballers
Morocco international footballers
Berber Moroccans
Stade Rennais F.C. players
Quimper Kerfeunteun F.C. players
Botola players
Ligue 1 players
Ligue 2 players
Expatriate footballers in France
Moroccan expatriate sportspeople in France
1978 African Cup of Nations players
People from Kenitra
Association football midfielders